Across the Barrier of Sound: PostScript is a 2020 compilation album consisting of material recorded in 1989 and 1990 by Game Theory, a California power pop band founded in 1982 by guitarist and singer-songwriter Scott Miller. The band's lineup during this period included Michael Quercio, who had previously fronted the Paisley Underground group The Three O'Clock.

The album was released by Omnivore Recordings on March 20, 2020. The collection of mostly previously unreleased songs from Game Theory's final lineup concludes Omnivore's series of Game Theory reissues which began in 2014.

Track listing

References

External links
 
 

Game Theory (band) albums
2020 compilation albums
Compilation albums published posthumously